Thomas George Butherway (17 June 1914 – 18 March 1997) was an Australian rules footballer who played with Fitzroy in the Victorian Football League (VFL).

He later served as a gunner in the Australian Army in World War II.

Notes

External links 

1914 births
1997 deaths
Australian rules footballers from Melbourne
Fitzroy Football Club players
Eltham Football Club players
People from Clifton Hill, Victoria
Australian military personnel of World War II
Military personnel from Melbourne